The Service Party is a political party in Kenya. The Party Symbol is a heart inside a circle.

History 
The party was founded in 2020 by Mwangi Kiunjuri, who was the former Agriculture Cabinet Secretary dropped from the cabinet by President Uhuru Kenyatta. The party has its Headquarters in Nairobi, along Matumbato Road.

The Service Party contested the 2022 Kenyan general election as part of Kenya Kwanza.The Party's slogan is Huduma-Twajiamini. As its philosophy, the party believes that government has responsibility to provide a range of social and economic services that continuously improve well-being and equality across society with particular concern for the most disadvantaged;  That public institutions should serve the common interests of the people with accountability and transparency. TSP seeks to provide a platform to Kenyans that represents, articulates and serves the interests of Kenyans who often feel disillusioned with big man/party politics that are often about established political players’ interests. Genuine participation in this kind of environment often feels constrained and sometimes even alienating. TSP is determined to be a voice of reason at all levels of government in the understanding that everyone deserves the opportunity to influence governmental decisions in the interest of the overall well-being of their communities to achieve social justice, respect for the rule of law, good governance and effective delivery of service to the public. the party's mission is to continuously create long-term value for our people, especially those most disadvantaged in order to address both systemic and emerging inequalities that are a source of indignity to households, communities and the larger society. The Party leader promised to focus on food insecurity, unemployment, low wages and health. Mwangi Kiunjuri the party leader says  "True leaders are called to serve selflessly, not to serve their interests. Service is what our people need. Service to humanity is service to God. TSP writes its promise of service in the hearts."Our symbol is a heart inside a circle nested in the background of our party colors. This symbol is our promise,"

References 

Political parties in Kenya
Political parties established in 2020
2020 establishments in Kenya